Serafino Sprovieri (18 May 1930 – 3 January 2018) was a Roman Catholic archbishop.

Sprovieri was ordained to the priesthood in 1953. He served as auxiliary bishop of the Archdiocese of Catanzaro, Italy from 1977 to 1980. He then served as Archbishop of Rossano-Cariati from 1980 to 1991. Sprovieri then served as Archbishop of Benevento from 1991 to 2006.

Notes

1930 births
2018 deaths
Archbishops of Benevento